Festival Session is an album by American pianist, composer and bandleader Duke Ellington recorded for the Columbia Records label in 1959. The album was rereleased on CD in 2004 with two bonus tracks.

Reception
The Allmusic reviewer Ken Dryden stated: "Duke Ellington was constantly composing new material as well as creating new arrangements of vintage works, as heard on this Columbia LP recorded in 1959... Long one of the classic sleepers awaiting discovery in Duke Ellington's considerable discography... Highly recommended".

Track listing
All compositions by Duke Ellington except as indicated
LP Side A
 "Perdido" (Juan Tizol) – 4:36
 "Copout Extension" – 8:19
 "Duael Fuel, Part 1" (Ellington, Clark Terry) – 2:45
 "Duael Fuel, Part 2" (Ellington, Terry) – 1:43
 "Duael Fuel, Part 3" (Ellington, Terry) – 6:17
LP side B
 "Idiom '59, Part 1" – 2:02
 "Idiom '59, Part 2" – 4:36
 "Idiom '59, Part 3" – 7:06
 "Things Ain't What They Used to Be" (Mercer Ellington) – 3:00
 "Launching Pad" (Ellington, Terry) – 7:37
Bonus tracks on 2004 CD re-issue
 "V.I.P.'s Boogie" – 2:57
 "Jam With Sam" – 3:17
Recorded at Columbia Records 30th Street Studio, New York on September 8, 1959.

Personnel
Duke Ellington – piano
Cat Anderson, Shorty Baker, Willie Cook, Fats Ford, Ray Nance, Clark Terry – trumpet
Britt Woodman – trombone
Quentin Jackson – trombone (tracks 1, 2 & 6-12), bass (tracks 3-5)
John Sanders – valve trombone
Jimmy Hamilton – clarinet, tenor saxophone
Johnny Hodges – alto saxophone
Russell Procope – alto saxophone, clarinet
Paul Gonsalves – tenor saxophone
Harry Carney – baritone saxophone
Jimmy Woode – bass (tracks 1, 2 & 9-12)
Joe Benjamin – bass (tracks 6-8)
Sam Woodyard, James Johnson – drums

References

Columbia CS 8200

Columbia Records albums
Duke Ellington albums
1960 albums
Albums recorded at CBS 30th Street Studio